Los Viagras is a criminal group based in Michoacán, Mexico. The leader of the group is Nicolás Sierra Santana ("El Gordo"), for whom  arrest warrants have been issued in connection with multiple counts of homicide, robbery, extortion, and kidnapping.

Origins and activities 
The gang began operating as a self-defense force (grupos de autodefensa comunitaria) in 2014. Former Michoacán security commissioner Alfredo Castillo Cervantes then asked them to assist in the efforts to capture the leader of the Los Caballeros Templarios cartel, Servando Gómez Martínez ("El Tuta"), who was then arrested in Morelia in February 2015.

The name of "Los Viagras" comes from a joke between them, due to the excessive use of hair gel by one of the younger brothers with a spiky hairstyle. When announcing the first attempt to disarm and dissolve the self-defense groups in December 2014, "Los Viagras", they took over the municipal presidency of Apatzingán and were violently evicted by the federal police on 6 January 2015, with a balance of 10 civilians dead and 21 wounded.

Los Viagras expanded into the drug trade, first by becoming involved in the production and transportation of methamphetamine, which brought them into a turf dispute with the Jalisco New Generation Cartel, particular the Tierra Caliente region of Michoacán.

One of the group's sicarios was arrested and charged in February 2019 for allegedly committing dozens of murders.

In February 2020, nine people, including three children, were killed by Jalisco New Generation gunmen in an arcade during a turf dispute.

As of June 2020, the Jalisco New Generation Cartel has been unsuccessful in taking territory held by Los Viagras in Tierra Caliente, covering parts of the states of Michoacán, Guerrero and the State of Mexico. Los Viagras and New Generation have been in conflict for control this region since 2017. Despite numerous New Generation attacks, Los Viagras and the Cartel del Abuelo were reported as having a "profound advantage" over New Generation in Tierra Caliente.

References

Organizations established in 2014
2014 establishments in Mexico
Drug cartels in Mexico